New Freedom Theatre is an African-American theatre company in residence at the Freedom Theatre in Philadelphia established in 1966. The theatre has mounted several hundred productions as well as having taught tens of thousands of students in their educational programs in their 50-year history, making it Pennsylvania's oldest African-American theatrical institution.

History

Transfer of ownership
The New Freedom Theatre's current space was built as one of the first mansions on Philadelphia's Broad Street, initially owned by a brewer by the name of William Gaul. Soon after in 1853, Edwin Forrest, a prolific tragedian, would purchase the home. Upon his death in 1872, Edwin left his estate to retired actors.

New Freedom Theatre was founded by John E. Allen, Jr in 1966 at a storefront in North Philadelphia. Robert E. Leslie, Sr. later helped found the company through his efforts of gaining, and utilizing, the Edwin Forrest mansion as their theatre space after joining forces with Allen in 1968. The facility now houses small meeting & rehearsal rooms, a black box theatre, private reception lobby, and 299-seat proscenium John E. Allen, Jr. Theatre.

Acquisition
July 10, 1990, The New Freedom Theatre is acquired by the Pennsylvania Historical and Museum Commission providing renovations for the New Freedom Theatre for a nominal sum.

Neighborhood
The New Freedom theatre is surrounded by other historical sites including the Blue Horizon boxing venue, located on the same block as the theatre, which dons a mural of Muhammed Ali, Joe Frazier, George Foreman, and Larry Holmes on its wall facing the theatre.

Across Master Street sits the Great Harvest Baptist Church, built 1823.

North of the theatre is the Leon H. Sullivan Human Services Center which houses a variety of social service organizations.

Leadership
After the death of co-founder and artistic director John E. Allen, Jr., the theatre's board of directors appointed Walter Dallas, former head of Philadelphia's University of the Arts theatre program. Dallas made the theatre an Equity house and created links with theatre professionals across the country to bring prominence to the New Freedom Theatre. Under the leadership of Walter Dallas, the company completed a $10-million capital fund-raising drive which created the 299-seat John E. Allen, Jr. theatre, which opened for the 1996–1997 season. (American Theatre 1995 Graham)

The current artistic director of The New Freedom Theatre is Rajendra Ramoon Maharaj. He is an Indo-Caribbean American artist, educator and activist. His credits at the New Freedom Theatre include The Ballad of Trayvon Martin, Jamaica, Don't Bother Me, I Can't Cope, The Colored Museum, and Walk Through Time.

The executive producing director is Sandra Norris Haughton. She is known as a successful professional in evaluating and implementing new strategies for cultural institutions in distress and developed transformational strategies to redefine and make them viable.

Education
New Freedom Theatre offers educational programming for all age groups including elementary, middle school, high school, and adults. Education program participants study traditional and contemporary performance skills & theory, various techniques, writing and aspects of technical production.

65% of Philadelphia school children finish high school while 98% of Freedom Theatre students do, and 55% of Philadelphia high school graduates move on to higher education while 85% of Freedom theatre students do.

Theatre alumni
Alumni of the theatre include: Leslie Odom, Erika Alexander, Samm-Art Williams, and Wayna Morris.

Adversity
In the early days of the theatre, Allen came face to face with crime such as prostitution and drug dealing that occurred within the theatre's neighborhood. To protect the young theatre students of the institution Allen would ask criminals to leave the area before classes began.

Crime has now decreased with the installment of more street lights, but there is still a feeling of unease as institutions, such as Temple University, expand across Philadelphia.

Controversy
Today, the theatre faces Temple University's encroaching presence on the theatre, and surrounding area, through its significant expansion in building projects. 
	 
In 2016, there was backlash when a group of instructors at the New Freedom Theatre Performing Arts Training School were fired after years of service; three of which were long-time faculty member, including two of Robert E. Leslie's daughters (Gail Leslie, Diane Leslie, and Patricia Hobbs). Leadership says they were revamping the program due to low enrollment and to make the theatre stronger and more sustainable.

References

African-American theatre companies
1966 establishments in Pennsylvania
Theatres in Philadelphia
Theatre companies in Pennsylvania
Companies based in Philadelphia